Palpita submarginalis is a moth in the family Crambidae. It was described by Francis Walker in 1866. It is found in Malaysia and Indonesia (Java).

References

Moths described in 1866
Palpita
Moths of Asia